Notosaria is a genus of brachiopods belonging to the family Notosariidae.

The species of this genus are found in New Zealand.

Species:

Notosaria nigricans 
Notosaria reinga 
Notosaria seymourensis

References

Brachiopod genera
Rhynchonellida